John or Johnny Morris may refer to:

Art and culture
John Morris (piper), Irish piper
John Morris (composer) (1926–2018), film composer often employed by Mel Brooks
John Chester Brooks Morris or Chester Morris (1901–1970),  American actor
John Morris (actor) (born 1984), American voice actor
John Morris (Australian actor) (born 1963), Australian television actor
John G. Morris (1916–2017), picture editor
John Meirion Morris (born 1936), Welsh sculptor
John Morris (sculptor) (born 1963), English sculptor
John Morris (filmmaker) (born 1983), American film screenwriter and producer

Military
John Morris (soldier) (1617–1649), English army officer
John W. Morris (1921–2013), U.S. Army general
John Morris (Medal of Honor) (1855–?), United States Marine Corps corporal who received the Medal of Honor
John Ignatius Morris (1842–1902), Royal Marines officer
John Thomas Morris (1931–2015), British Army soldier
 John Morris (activity 1663-1672), (see below), British pirate and privateer with Henry Morgan

Politics and law
John Morris, Baron Morris of Aberavon (born 1931), British politician, former Attorney-General
John Morris (Australian politician) (1936–2013), Australian senator
John Morris (Conservative politician) (1894–1962), British MP for Salford North, 1931–1945
John Morris, Baron Morris of Borth-y-Gest (1896–1979), British law lord
John Morris (judge) (1902–1956), Australian jurist
John Carnac Morris (1798–1858), English civil servant of the East India Company
J. H. C. Morris (John Humphrey Carlile Morris, 1910–1984), academic lawyer
John Henry Morris (1828–1912), administrator in British India

Religion
John Morris (Hebraist) (1595–1648), Regius Professor of Hebrew at Oxford University (1626)
John Morris (bishop) (1866–1946), American prelate of the Roman Catholic Church
John Brande Morris (1812–1886), English Anglican theologian, later a Roman Catholic priest
John Edward Morris (1889–1987), American Roman Catholic priest
John Gottlieb Morris (1803–1895), American Lutheran minister and entomologist
John Hughes Morris (1870–1953), English Presbyterian minister, editors and writer
John Morris (Jesuit) (1826–1893), English Jesuit and historical writer
John Moses Morris (1837–1873), American minister and author
John D. Morris (born 1946), Christian creationist

Sports

Baseball
John Morris (pitcher) (born 1941), professional baseball pitcher
John Harold Goodwin Morris or Yellowhorse Morris (1902–1959), American baseball pitcher
John Morris (outfielder) (born 1961), baseball player, played 1986–1992

Cricket
John Morris (Australian cricketer) (1831–1921), Australian cricketer
John Morris (cricketer, born 1880), English cricketer
John Morris (New Zealand cricketer) (1933–1970), New Zealand cricketer
John Morris (South African cricketer) (1940–2011), South African cricketer
John Morris (cricketer, born 1964), English cricketer

Other sports
John Morris (footballer, born 1873) (1873–?), Chirk F.C. and Wales international footballer
John Morris (bowls), former lawn bowls competitor for New Zealand
John Morris (New Zealand footballer) (born 1950), New Zealand international footballer
John Morris (curler) (born 1978), Canadian curler
John Morris (rugby league) (born 1980), Australian rugby league coach

Others
John Albert Morris (1836–1895), American businessman
John Morris (physician) (1759-1793), American physician
Sir John Morris, 1st Baronet (1745–1819), Welsh industrialist
John Morris (geologist) (1810–1886), geologist
John McLean Morris (1911–1993), American gynecologist
John Morris (historian) (1913–1977), English historian
John Morris (anthropologist) (1895–1980), British mountaineer and journalist
John Morris (pirate), English buccaneer
John Morris, a character in the video game series Castlevania
John Morris and Sons Salford, manufacturers of all kinds of fire fighting equipment

See also
 Johnny Morris (disambiguation)
 Jack Morris (disambiguation)
 John Maurice, Prince of Nassau-Siegen (1604–1679), count and (from 1674) prince of Nassau-Siegen
 John Morris-Jones (1864–1929), Welsh grammarian, academic and poet
 Jon Morris (born 1942), American college and professional football player
 Jon Morris (ice hockey) (born 1966), American ice hockey player
 John Morice (disambiguation)
 Jonathan Morris (disambiguation)
 Morris (surname)